Ruatara oparica is a species of small air-breathing land snail, a terrestrial pulmonate gastropod mollusk in the family Charopidae. This species is endemic to French Polynesia.

References

Fauna of French Polynesia
Ruatara (gastropod)
Gastropods described in 1839
Taxonomy articles created by Polbot